Laura Stigger (born 25 September 2000) is an Austrian racing cyclist. She won the women's junior road race at the 2018 UCI Road World Championships and the junior Mountain Bike race (XCO) event at the 2018 UCI Mountain Bike World Championships. She also won the junior Mountain Bike race (XCO) event at the 2017 UCI Mountain Bike World Championships.

To date, Stigger is the only cyclist to win both the Road World Championship and the Mountain Bike World Championship in the same year, winning both titles within twenty-two days.
The former was only her second road race ever.

In 2017 and 2018, she won every Junior Mountain Bike race she participated in, a total of 26 races, with most of them at international level.  It was the same when she was younger still.

She competed in the cross-country race at the 2020 Summer Olympics.

Major results

Mountain bike

2017
 1st  Cross-country, UCI World Junior Championships
 1st  Cross-country, UEC European Junior Championships
2018
 1st  Cross-country, UCI World Junior Championships
 1st  Cross-country, UEC European Junior Championships
2020
 1st  Cross-country, National Championships
 Swiss Bike Cup
1st Gstaad
 1st Rund um den Roadlberg
2021
 National Championships
1st  Short track
1st  Eliminator
 1st  Overall Cape Epic (with Sina Frei)
1st Prologue, Stages 1, 2, 3, 4, 5, 6 & 7
 Swiss Bike Cup
1st Basel
 1st Coppa Citta' Di Albenga
 2nd  Cross-country, UCI World Under-23 Championships
 UCI XCO World Cup
3rd Leogang
2021
 UCI XCO World Cup
3rd Leogang

Road

2018
 1st  Road race, UCI Junior Road World Championships

References

External links

 

2000 births
Living people
Austrian female cyclists
Place of birth missing (living people)
Cyclists at the 2018 Summer Youth Olympics
Cyclists at the 2020 Summer Olympics
Olympic cyclists of Austria
21st-century Austrian women